Typhoon Etau, known in the Philippines as Typhoon Kabayan, produced near-record winds and rainfall in Japan in August 2003. The tenth named storm and fifth typhoon of the 2003 Pacific typhoon season, Etau developed on August 2, and gradually intensified while moving to the northwest. Etau formed an eye and became a large storm by the time it approached Okinawa on August 7. The typhoon attained peak winds of  before weakening slightly while turning to the northeast. Etau made landfall on the Japanese island of Shikoku on August 8, and later moved across portions of Honshu and Hokkaido. After weakening to tropical storm status, the cyclone became extratropical on August 9 and dissipated three days later.

While passing northeast of the Philippines, the typhoon caused light damage in the archipelago. The eye crossed over Okinawa, where Etau left 166,800 people without power and caused 10 injuries. The combination of winds and rainfall caused landslides, particularly on Hokkaido. Nationwide, Etau killed 20 people, destroyed 708 houses, and caused ¥35.1 billion (JPY, $294.8 million USD) in damage.

Meteorological history

The origins of Typhoon Etau were from an area of convection that persisted along the west side of a weak circulation near Chuuk State on July 31. With initially moderate but steadily decreasing wind shear, the system was able to organize as it moved generally westward. On August 2, the Joint Typhoon Warning Center (JTWC) initiated advisories on Tropical Depression 11W. That day, another circulation was developing on the western side of the system, briefly classified by the Taiwan Central Weather Bureau as a tropical depression. The eastern circulation became dominant with pronounced outflow to the south, although it was initially broad and elongated. Later on August 2, the Japan Meteorological Agency (JMA) classified the system as a tropical depression to the northeast of Yap.

With a subtropical ridge in the vicinity of the Marianas Islands, the nascent depression moved to the northwest. On August 3, the JMA upgraded the depression to tropical storm status, naming it Etau. An upper-level low to the northeast improved northerly outflow, allowing the storm to strengthen quickly. On August 4 the Philippine Atmospheric, Geophysical and Astronomical Services Administration (PAGASA) began issuing advisories as the storm approached the region, naming it Kabayan. Late on August 4, the JMA upgraded Etau to typhoon status, with the storm later developing an eye. An approaching shortwave trough weakened the ridge, causing Etau to turn more to the north.

After reaching peak winds, Etau began turning to the north-northeast due to the approaching trough, passing near Amami Ōshima. By that time, the typhoon had become large, with gale-force winds extending  in diameter. Increasing wind shear and cooler air caused Etau to weaken. The typhoon still maintained 10 minute winds of  when it made landfall near Muroto on the Japanese island of Shikoku, shortly before 1300 UTC on August 8. Continuing northeastward, the typhoon weakened into a severe tropical storm as it passed near Awaji Island, before making landfall on Honshu near Nishinomiya at 2100 UTC on August 8. While accelerating to the northeast, Etau lost tropical characteristics over land. After briefly reaching open waters to the northeast of Honshu, the storm made its final landfall near Erimo, Hokkaido at 1630 UTC on August 9, shortly before becoming extratropical. This was based on analysis from the JMA, whereas the JTWC assessed the storm remaining offshore Hokkaido. The remnants of Etau entered the Sea of Okhotsk and persisted for several more days, dissipating on August 12 to the west of the Kamchatka Peninsula.

Preparations and impact

Rough waves from Typhoon Etau produced rip currents on Saipan that swept up four swimmers, who were later rescued after holding onto a buoy. The outer periphery of the storm caused P36.98 million (PHP, $673,000 USD) in damage, mostly to infrastructure with some minor crop damage. Late in its duration, Etau caused damage in Russia's Kuril Islands.

While Etau was in the vicinity of Okinawa, wind gusts at Kadena Air Base reached . Throughout Okinawa prefecture, the typhoon left 166,800 buildings without power due to the strong winds. Etau damaged seven buildings, blocked one road, and caused moderate damage to crops and fisheries. In the Amami Islands, about 45,000 houses, lost power due to high winds from the storm, affecting 53% of residents. Etau injured ten people in the island group, including one man who was blown off his roof. Officials closed the Naha Airport due to the typhoon, causing 293 flights in the region to be canceled. Ahead of the storm, ExxonMobil oil refineries in Okinawa were closed, but were reopened after sustaining minimal damage.

At the time, this was the third strongest gust ever reported there, behind Typhoon Nancy in 1961 and Typhoon Shirley in 1965. Sustained winds there reached . About 95% of the rainfall total in Kōchi fell in 24 hours. Rainfall at Biratori, Hokkaido reached  in a 48‑hour period, the highest at the station since records began in 1962. This caused the highest sediment levels in the river since the 1960s, washing about  into the Nibutani Dam. In addition the rainfall, Etau spawned a weak tornado near Kumagaya on the Honshu mainland, rated around an F1. The typhoon brought a plume of warm air to the country that caused the warmest temperatures of the year at that point.

The heavy rainfall in Tokushima caused landslides and blocked roads, resulting in disruptions to bus and train service. Strong winds overturned a truck, injuring the two occupants. In Muroto, several people were injured by flying glass. Rough waves killed two people in the same city, one in Fukuoka, damaged the seawall in Kyoto, and damaged 25 ships. In Takamatsu, Kagawa, Etau left about ¥1.2 billion (JPY, $10 million USD) in crop damage, mainly due to damaged greenhouses. Two workers were killed in Higashiuwa after being swept away by a river. On Hokkaido, heavy rainfall caused landslides, damaging hundreds of roads and bridges and isolating several villages. River flooding swept away a vehicle in Kamishihoro, killing the five occupants. Along Mount Poroshiri, 29 people were rescued by helicopter from a mountain lodge after Etau blocked off their descending trail.

Throughout Japan, Etau caused over 1,000 flights to be canceled, and for bullet trains to operate at a slower speed, causing delays. About 62,000 people lost power during the storm, and across the country. The typhoon destroyed 708 houses and flooded 2,253 others, causing over 6,000 people to evacuate to storm shelters. About  of fields were damaged. Throughout Japan, Etau killed 20 people and injured 93 others, 19 of them seriously. Overall damage totaled ¥35.1 billion (JPY, US$294.8 million). Largely because Etau remained tropical and weakened over Japan, damage was much less than Typhoon Tokage a year later, which produced comparable rainfall totals at a similar intensity but struck the country while extratropical.

See also

Typhoon Neoguri (2014)
Typhoon Tokage (2004)

Notes

References

External links

JMA General Information of Typhoon Etau (0310) from Digital Typhoon
JMA Best Track Data of Typhoon Etau (0310) 
JMA Best Track Data (Graphics) of Typhoon Etau (0310)
JMA Best Track Data (Text)
JTWC Best Track Data of Typhoon 11W (Etau)
11W.ETAU from the U.S. Naval Research Laboratory

2003 Pacific typhoon season
Typhoons in Japan
2003 in Japan
Typhoons
Etau